My Big Fat Supernatural Honeymoon, edited by P.N. Elrod,  is the 2007 sequel to the 2006 book My Big Fat Supernatural Wedding.  Honeymoon is an anthology of honeymoon stories contributed by several authors such as the author of the Otherworld series Kelley Armstrong, the author of The Morganville Vampires series Rachel Caine, and many more.

List of stories

Stories

Stalked

Heorot

Roman Holiday, or SPQ-arrrrrr

Her Mother's Daughter

Newlydeads

Where the Heart Lives

Cat Got Your Tongue?

Half of Being Married

A Wulf in Groom's Clothing

Awards
The book made the New York Times Best Seller extended list and won Honorable Mention in the 2007 Pearl Awards for best anthology.

References

Further reading

2007 non-fiction books
Paranormal romance anthologies
Fantasy anthologies
Horror anthologies